Baaghi 2 is a 2018 Indian Hindi-language action thriller film directed by Ahmed Khan. Produced by Nadiadwala Grandson Entertainment, it is the second installment in Baaghi film series, a spiritual sequel to the 2016 film Baaghi and a remake of the 2016 Telugu film Kshanam. It stars Tiger Shroff, Disha Patani, Manoj Bajpayee, Darshan Kumar, Prateik Babbar, Randeep Hooda, Deepak Dobriyal and Arravya Sharma.

and tells the story of Ranveer "Ronnie" Pratap Singh, an Indian Army officer who sets out to find and rescue his ex-girlfriend's three-year-old daughter from the clutches of her kidnappers in Goa. Principal photography commenced for the film in August 2017, and it was shot in Mumbai, Pune, Shanghai, Goa, China, Manali and Thailand.

Baaghi 2 was released worldwide on 30 March 2018 including 3500 screens in India.  The film grossed over  worldwide to become one of the top highest-grossing Bollywood film of 2018.

Plot

Neha, a married woman has a daughter, Rhea whom she loves dearly. On Rhea's first day of school, Neha is attacked by masked men. She files a complaint to police, saying the men took Rhea away. The police conduct an investigation but find nothing. Undeterred by this, Neha seeks help from her ex-boyfriend Ranveer "Ronnie" Pratap Singh, an Indian Army Para SF soldier. In past, Ronnie met Neha during their college time and fell in love with her at first sight. After some time, she too fell in love with Ronnie. Both of them decided to get married. However, her father Mahendra got diagnosed with cancer and before dying, requested Neha to marry Shekhar, a wealthy businessman. Wanting to fulfill Mahendra's last wish, Neha tearfully broke up with Ronnie. Back in present, Ronnie meets a terrified Neha and agrees to help her. Ronnie still loves Neha but is aware of the fact that Neha is married. They reach police station where the F.I.R. writer, Inspector Sharad misbehaves to Neha. Ronnie beats up him in retaliation, an action that gets him arrested. But, he is soon released on a request from D.I.G. Ajay, a batchmate of Ronnie's commanding officer Colonel Ranjit.

Ronnie is summoned back by Ranjit to the base, but changes his mind while traveling with a local physically disabled agent, Usman whose help he has sought, and goes to Rhea's school. The principal denies any kidnapping incident around the school premises. Ronnie meets Shekhar's brother Sunny, a drug addict and follows him to a building where he finds out Usman is involved in drug peddling. In the process, Ronnie fights and defeats the two people. He asks Usman about Rhea, but Usman doesn't seem to know anything. Meanwhile, Police Commissioner Loha Singh Dhull (LSD) is assigned to the case. Shekhar meets and tells Ronnie that Neha was diagnosed with Post-traumatic stress disorder and began to hallucinate about having a daughter Rhea, while also adding that he doesn't have a daughter. Ronnie checks the CCTV footage and finds out no one else other than Neha in the car. He angrily yells at Neha, who asks him to leave. Just about to leave, he sees the height measurements on the wall indicating that Rhea could be a real child and begins to doubt himself, but it is a split second too late as Neha jumps from the grill and commits suicide, feeling helpless as no one believed her.

Eventually, Usman admits to having seen Rhea when he visits Ronnie at a hotel—he called Sunny for drug delivery when he spotted his men taking a blindfolded Rhea to a den; he paid Usman to keep mum. They go to a bar; Ronnie chases Sunny but LSD captures Ronnie, who he asked to wait at the hotel. The police interrogate Sunny, but Ajay shoots him to death in a heated moment. Ronnie says he has evidence that Rhea is alive, and gets Usman to meet Ajay and LSD. Ajay takes Ronnie to his home, telling him that he lost his family in an accident. At the same time, two attackers brutally beat Usman. Ronnie comes there, finds Usman bleeding and fights the two attackers. Usman dies due to his injuries. Ronnie takes the phone of an attacker, and sees a photo of himself taken in Ajay's house, figuring out Ajay is the mastermind. He goes to his army base, battles many goons in the jungle single handedly , and destroys helicopters while bleeding. Ronnie kills a person who acted as Rhea's father, but is shot by Ajay, who reveals that Shekhar is responsible for Rhea's kidnapping. Shekhar burnt all of Rhea's photos and toys. Ronnie beats up Ajay brutally but when Ajay is about to Kill Ronnie, LSD shoots Ajay to death. Ronnie sees Rhea before fainting. LSD explains Shekhar was sterile, which moved him to take up this drastic step, implying that Rhea is Ronnie's daughter. Ronnie remembers when Neha told him she has to marry Shekhar, he and Neha ended up making love. In the end, Ronnie takes Rhea to his house and imagines Neha smiling at him, smiling back.

Cast

Production

Development 
On 1 May 2017, Tiger Shroff posted the first look poster of the film on his Twitter account. The producer of the film, Sajid Nadiadwala, collaborated with Fox Star Studios and the film was released under Fox Star Studios and Nadiadwala Grandson Entertainment.

Initially, it was reported that Jacqueline Fernandez and Kriti Sanon were considered for the lead female role. However, in June 2017, Disha Patani was cast after going through a screen test with Shroff. Talking about the cast, Nadiadwala said, "They share an amazing onscreen chemistry, which was evident in their look test. Disha is just perfect for the role. I am happy with my cast and am excited to kick-start the project."

Shroff went to Hong Kong for training of martial arts under action director Tonny Ching while Patani received acrobatic training.

In July 2017, Nadiadwala cast Prateik Babbar to play the negative role.

Filming 
Principal photography started on 8 August 2017. The shoot began with a song featuring the lead cast members on a set in Mumbai, followed by scenes shot on the campus of FLAME University in Pune and several other places. Then the team filmed in Manali, Thailand, China, Goa and Ladakh. A torture scene of Shroff's character was filmed while the actor was naked.

Marketing and release 
The first trailer of the film was launched on 21 February 2018 by Shroff and Patani. The film was released worldwide on 30 March 2018. It opened in 4,125 screens in 46 countries, including 3,500 screens in India.

Box office

Baaghi 2 earned  net on its opening day, marking the biggest opening-day of 2018 (ahead of Padmaavat), the biggest Good Friday opening, the third biggest opening in the last 15 months (behind Tiger Zinda Hai and Golmaal Again), and the seventh biggest for an action film. After a robust opening day, it fell gradually by −20% on its second day earning an additional . In doing so, the film eclipsed the entire opening weekend –  – of the first film in just two days. Box office pundits believed the fall could have been lesser had Friday not been a partial holiday, owing to Good Friday.

Overseas, it made  after two weeks. The film grossed a total of  worldwide, including  in India and  overseas. The film was one of the highest-grossing Bollywood films of 2018.

Critical reception
Baaghi 2 received generally negative reviews.

Rajeev Masand gave the film a rating of 2 out of 5, saying that "It's hard to feel anything other than sheer frustration watching Baaghi 2, given how the filmmakers have squandered the potential of the central idea. This remake of the 2016 Telugu hit Kshanam is weighed down by a flawed script, and frankly by 'misdirection' on the part of director Ahmed Khan. Rohit Vats of Hindustan Times criticized the film saying that, "It's a badly planned screenplay that doesn't know what it wants to be. From chasing Rambo's trail to taking the baton from Dum Maaro Dum, it tries every trick in the book and manages to make them worse" and gave it a rating of 1 out of 5.

Shubhra Gupta of The Indian Express gave the film a rating of 2.5 out of 5 and said that "The trouble with a full-on masala film going in search of a plot is evident in the way the film unspools. The bare-bones are borrowed from Telugu thriller Kshanam, but the fillings are all strictly Bollywood". Rachit Gupta of The Times of India gave the film a rating of 2.5 out of 5 and said that, "Director Ahmed Khan's movie trades style for substance. The action sequences look slick, but they feel completely needless and a bit too excessive. It's disappointing that the story suffers in this attempt to impress with the action choreography and stunts."

Saibal Chatterjee of NDTV gave the film a rating of 2 out of 5, saying that "Baaghi 2 is more a two-and-a-half-hour stunt show than a genuine piece of cinema. Neither the heart nor the mind stands a chance of surviving this relentless onslaught of biceps, pecs, and clenched fists."

The movie was criticised for featuring a scene in which the protagonist Ronny (Tiger Shroff) ties a Kashmiri civilian to a jeep for burning the Indian flag and pelting stones; a direct reference to a controversial 2017 incident in which a group of Indian soldiers similarly used a human shield as a precautionary measure against violent crowds in Kashmir. In her review for the Hindustan Times, Priyanka Sundar called the scene "one of the most distasteful and offensive portrayals of the Jammu and Kashmir unrest". In Scroll, Nandini Ramnath criticised the "tone-deafness and staggering lack of sensitivity to the reality of the April human rights violation". Anupama Chopra of Film Companion gave the film 2.5 out of 5 stars and said, "Baaghi 2 is a faithful remake of the 2016 Telugu thriller Kshanam. But since the leading man is Tiger Shroff, the protagonist changes from an investment banker to an army commando." Raja Sen of NDTV gave the film 1 out of 5 stars and said, "This is an action film without enough action and a romantic drama where you don't feel for the characters."

Soundtrack 

The music of the film was composed by Laxmikant-Pyarelal, Mithoon, Arko, Sandeep Shirodkar, Gourov-Roshin, and Pranaay Rijia. Lyrics were written by Kumaar, Ginny Diwan, Javed Akhtar, Arko Pravo Mukherjee, and Sayeed Quadri. The background score was composed by Julius Packiam. The songs featured in the film are sung by Atif Aslam, Jubin Nautiyal, Ankit Tiwari, Navraj Hans, Shreya Ghoshal, Palak Muchhal, Shruti Pathak, Parry G, Pranaay Rijia, Anand Bhaskar, Siddharth Basrur, Jatinder Singh and Big Dhillon.

The first song of the film, "Mundiyan", which is a recreated version of the Panjabi MC song "Mundian To Bach Ke", was sung by Navraj Hans and Palak Muchhal, and was released on 1 March 2018. The second single to be released was "O Saathi", sung by Atif Aslam, and released on 9 March 2018. The third song of the film, "Lo Safar", sung by Jubin Nautiyal, was released on 13 March 2018. The fourth song, "Ek Do Teen", an item song featuring Jacqueline Fernandez, from the 1988 film, Tezaab, was recreated for this film. It was sung by Shreya Ghoshal with a rap by Parry G, and was released on 19 March 2018. Although in the film, the song is sung by Palak Muchhal for the final version because the production team made a mistake by including the rehearsal version in the final version of the film. After that, Palak Muchhal's version was released on 19 April 2019. The music album was released on 20 March 2018 by T-Series.

Sequel

On 19 February 2018, the third installment of the film was announced under the title of Baaghi 3, with Sajid Nadiawala as producer, Ahmed Khan as director, Tiger Shroff and Shraddha Kapoor starring in the lead roles. The team started shooting in September 2019. It was released worldwide on 6 March 2020.
Ritesh Deshmukh also joined the cast of the film.

References

External links 

 
 
 

2010s Hindi-language films
2018 action thriller films
Indian action thriller films
Indian martial arts films
2018 martial arts films
Fox Star Studios films
Films shot in Thailand
Films shot in Mumbai
Films about child abuse
Films about child abduction in India
Films about missing people
Films shot in Maharashtra
Hindi remakes of Telugu films
Indian films about revenge
Indian nonlinear narrative films
Films directed by Ahmed Khan